Robert J. Blendon is the Richard L. Menschel Professor of Public Health and Professor of Health Policy and Political Analysis, Emeritus and Acting Director for the Division of Policy Translation and Leadership Development at the  Harvard T.H. Chan School of Public Health. For decades he held appointments as a Professor of Health Policy and Political Analysis at both the Harvard T.H. Chan School of Public Health and the Harvard Kennedy School of Government.  In addition, he directs the Harvard Opinion Research Program, which focuses on better understanding of public knowledge, attitudes, and beliefs about major social policy issues in the U.S. and other nations.  He currently co-directs the Robert Wood Johnson Foundation/Harvard T.H. Chan School of Public Health project on understanding Americans’ Health Agenda, including a joint series with National Public Radio and POLITICO. Previously, he co-directed a special polling series with The Washington Post and Kaiser Family Foundation. Additionally, Dr. Blendon co-directed a special survey project for the Minneapolis Star Tribune on health care that received the National Press Club’s 1998 Award for Consumer Journalism.  He also co-directed a project for National Public Radio and the Henry J. Kaiser Family Foundation on American attitudes toward domestic policy.  The series was cited by the National Journal as setting a new standard for use of public opinion surveys in broadcast journalism. In 2008, Dr. Blendon received the Warren J. Mitofsky Award for Excellence in Public Opinion Research from the Board of Directors of the Roper Center for Public Opinion Research at Cornell University.

Prior Appointments 
Between 1987 and 1996 he served as Chairman of the Department of Health Policy and Management at the Harvard T.H. Chan School of Public Health and as Deputy Director of the Harvard University Division of Health Policy Research and Education.  Prior to his Harvard appointment, Dr. Blendon was senior vice-president at the Robert Wood Johnson Foundation.  In addition, he has served as a senior faculty member for the U.S. Conference of Mayors, the National Governors' Association, and the U.S. Congress Committee on Ways and Means.

Teaching 
Dr. Blendon teaches a course on Political Strategy in U.S. Health Policy at the Harvard Kennedy School of Government and the Harvard T.H. Chan School of Public Health. He also directs the Political Analysis track in the University’s Ph.D. Program in Health Policy.

Professional Affiliations and Awards 
Dr. Blendon is a member of the Institute of Medicine, of the National Academy of Sciences and of the Council on Foreign Relations, a former member of the advisory board to the Director of the Centers for Disease Control and Prevention, and a former member of the editorial board of the Journal of the American Medical Association. He is also a Past President of the Association of Health Services Research and winner of their Distinguished Investigator Award. He is also a recipient of the Baxter Award for lifetime achievement in the health services research field. He has also received the John M. Eisenberg Excellence in Mentorship Award from the Agency for Healthcare Research and Quality (AHRQ) and the Mendelsohn award from Harvard University. In 2008, he was the recipient of the Warren J. Mitofsky Award for Excellence in Public Opinion Research given by the Roper Center.

Education 
He is a graduate of Marietta College. He is also a graduate of the School of Business at the University of Chicago, with a Masters in Business Administration.  In addition, he holds a Doctoral degree from the School of Public Health of Johns Hopkins University, where his principal attention was directed toward health policy.

Personal life 
Dr. Blendon is married to Dr. Marie C. McCormick, a Professor Emerita at the Harvard T.H. Chan School of Public Health in Boston, Massachusetts, and they live in Waban, Massachusetts.

References

External links

Year of birth missing (living people)
Living people
Harvard Kennedy School faculty
Johns Hopkins University alumni
Marietta College alumni
People from Ohio
People from Newton, Massachusetts
Harvard School of Public Health faculty
University of Chicago alumni